Zdeněk Doležal (born 1 September 1931) is a Czech former pair skater who competed internationally for Czechoslovakia. With his skating partner, Věra Suchánková, he is the 1958 World silver medalist and a two-time European champion (1957, 1958). They represented Czechoslovakia at the 1956 Winter Olympics and placed 8th.

Doležal was born on 1 September 1931 in Prague. His sports club was Rapid Pardubice. In 2016, Pardubice named him as one of the athletes to be included in the city's planned sports hall of fame.

Results
(with Věra Suchánková)

References

External links
 

1931 births
Possibly living people
Czechoslovak male pair skaters
Olympic figure skaters of Czechoslovakia
Figure skaters at the 1956 Winter Olympics
Figure skaters from Prague
World Figure Skating Championships medalists
European Figure Skating Championships medalists